The Paradise Water Tower, of Paradise, Kansas, is a historic Works Progress Administration project of 1938.  It is located east of the intersection of Waldo and Main Sts. in Paradise.  The tower was designed in the WPA Rustic style and features an Art Deco limestone entrance surround.  It was listed on the National Register of Historic Places in 2007.

It is a 17-foot diameter rusticated limestone tower that rises 35 feet and can hold up to 58,000 gallons of water.

References 

Art Deco architecture in Kansas
Infrastructure completed in 1938
Buildings and structures in Russell County, Kansas
WPA Rustic architecture
Works Progress Administration in Kansas
National Register of Historic Places in Russell County, Kansas
Water towers on the National Register of Historic Places in Kansas